Oreopanax candamoanus is a species of plant in the family Araliaceae. It is endemic to Peru.

References

candamoanus
Vulnerable plants
Trees of Peru
Taxonomy articles created by Polbot